Diogo Leite may refer to:

 Diogo Leite (footballer, born 1989), Portuguese footballer
 Diogo Leite (footballer, born 1999), Portuguese footballer